Play Along Toys was a Florida-based toy company, and a wholly owned division of Jakks Pacific.

In 1999, the founders of Play Along (among them Charlie Emby, Jay Foreman, and Larry Geller) chose the Britney Spears Doll line as the first licensing venture with their new company.  The choice proved successful and was followed by other celebrity dolls including Aaron Carter, Venus Williams, Serena Williams and Mandy Moore. In 2001 Play Along partnered with toy design studio Art Asylum for production of the studio's toys. Then, in 2002, Play Along decided to bring back one of the plush doll lines of the 1980s, the Care Bears. This brand, for which Play Along was awarded "License of the Year 2002" by the Licensing Industry Merchandisers' Association (LIMA).

As the company's toy lines continued to grow, so did the Play Along team, having grown from a staff of five into a company with more than 100 employees, both in the U.S. and Hong Kong, producing toys for multiple brands including the Care Bears, The Dog and Friends, The Lord of the Rings: Armies of Middle-earth, The Cat in the Hat, Teletubbies, Curly Q's, Doodle Bear, Sky Dancers and the Cabbage Patch Kids.

The success of the company and its licenses made it an attractive target for others, with Jakks Pacific buying the privately owned company in 2004, Play Along now run as a division within Jakks.

In Fall of 2007, Play Along released dolls and playsets based on Disney Channel TV series, Hannah Montana, and movie, the Cheetah Girls. The lines were very popular during the Christmas season. As of Fall 2008, more products have been added onto the Hannah Montana line, including the 2008 Holiday Popstar doll and Malibu Beach House playset; also, dolls based on the Disney Channel movie, Camp Rock, were launched.
In 2009, the last doll line was made and the company closed.

Products

1999
 Britney Spears Dolls
 Sabrina: The Animated Series Dolls
 Bruce Lee/Enter the Dragon
 Bubblegum
 Venus Williams and Serena Williams Dolls
 V.I.P. Dolls

2000
 Mandy Moore Doll
 Sisqo Doll

2001
 Aaron Carter Doll
 Precious Moments
 Lisa Frank
 A*Teens Dolls
 Dream Dolls
 2gether Dolls
 LFO Dolls

2002
 Care Bears
 Spy Kids

2004
 Cabbage Patch Kids
 Doodle Bear/Doodle Monster (Discontinued 2008)
 The Lord of the Rings (2004 only)
 Teletubbies

2005
 Sky Dancers
 Dragon Flyz

2006
 Domo
 Puppy in My Pocket
 Speed Stacks (discontinued 2008)

2007
 Cheetah Girls Dolls (2007 only)
 Hairspray Dolls (2007 only)
 Hannah Montana Dolls
 Barney
 Play Along Club (2007 only)
 Sweet Secrets (Discontinued 2008)

2008
 Camp Rock Dolls
 The Chronicles of Narnia: Prince Caspian
 Clifford
 Curious George
 Miffy
 NASCAR
 Taylor Swift Doll
 The Wiggles
 SpongeBob SquarePants

2009
 Hannah Montana: The Movie Dolls

References

Toy companies of the United States
Companies based in Florida
Doll manufacturing companies